Ralf Stemmann (21 June 1958 – 7 August 2017) was a German-born record producer, composer, remixer, keyboard player and synthesizer programmer. Global record sales of productions, he has been involved in as a composer, producer and arranger exceed 150 million units. He earned Latin Grammy nominations for his work with Paulina Rubio (“Yo No Soy Esa Mujer”, Best Music Video, as a composer) and Luz Rios (“Aire”, Best New Artist and Best Female Pop Vocal Album, as producer). He also won the 20th Annual USA Songwriting Competition in the Latin category with the song "Enamorados" with Luz Rios in 2014. He died on 7 August 2017 in Malibu, California.

Biography

Personal life
Ralf Stemmann was born in Germany. He received a broad classical piano instruction from 1965 to 1981. With time he gained experience and developed his talent through hundreds of live appearances and by writing vocal and instrumental parts for Top-40 bands. Later he learned comprehensive studio techniques in engineering, arranging, synthesizer programming and sound design at Studio 33 (formerly Star Studio) together with Spanish producer Luis Rodriguez. He also instructed adults and children in piano, organ and harmony theory at the private music school of Frank Valdor. His musical art was sought after by artists from all over the world, which made him travel extensively. He lived and worked in Hamburg, Berlin, London, Miami and since more than 20 years now in Los Angeles, allowing him to collaborate with a diverse array of artists and earning many awards. On 7 August 2017, he died at age of 59.

Professional career
He started his music career in the early 80s with Schampus, with the project "Phantom In Rom" for the label Night’n’Day Records where he collaborated with Mike Mareen. In the mid 1980s, Stemmann worked as a studio engineer and sound designer at Studio 33  with Modern Talking, being co-arranger together with Luis Rodríguez.

His credits as a producer, composer, arranger and keyboard player include collaborations with: Modern Talking, Chris Norman, C.C. Catch, Blue System, Engelbert Humperdinck, London Boys, Nino de Angelo, London Royal Philharmonic Orchestra, Baccara, Marianne Rosenberg, Roberto Blanco, Howard Carpendale, Mary Roos, Bonnie Bianco, Ricky Shayne, Audrey Landers, Jason Everly, Paul Bennett, The Three Degrees, Michael Holm, Denyce Graves, Thelma Houston, Trini Lopez, Smokie, The Tremeloes, Thomas Anders and many others.

Ralf also composed, produced and arranged music for films, TV and videos including ZDF-Hitparade and several episodes of the TV crime-show Tatort, The Old Fox and TV series such as Rivalen der Rennbahn, videos for Sportschau, themes for the PBS Kids series The Huggabug Club, themes for the Buscando Estrellas series from 1992-1993 as well as Supermodels of the World, International Auto-Show Detroit and others.

After moving to USA, he worked as composer, producer, arranger of Latin stars, some of them are Ricky Martin, Thalia, Paulina Rubio, Marta Sanchez, Luz Rios, Paloma San Basilio, Martin Nievera, Cusco, Sarah Geronimo, Pablo Ruiz, besides others. He got to win the Latin grammy for his productions and is considered one of the best music producers of this music market.

Awards

|-
! 
! 
! 
! Credits
! 
|-
|rowspan=1|1989
|rowspan=1|"Rivalen der Rennbahn" (soundtrack album)
|rowspan=1|BMG Ariola / Hansa (Germany) Gold Album
|rowspan=1|Arranger
|

|-
|rowspan=1|1990
|rowspan=1|"Twilight" - Blue System
|rowspan=1|BMG Ariola / Hansa (Germany) Gold Album
|rowspan=1|Arranger
|

|-
|rowspan=1|1994
|rowspan=1|"Mujer" - Marta Sanchez
|rowspan=1|Polygram Iberica (Spain)  Gold Album
|rowspan=1|Arranger, producer, composer
|

|-
|rowspan=1|1994
|rowspan=1|"Love Is The Answer" - Teri Ann Linn
|rowspan=1|Fazer Music / Warner (Philippines)   Gold Album
|rowspan=1|Arranger, producer, composer
|

|-
|rowspan=1|1995-2000
|rowspan=1|"The Huggabug Club" (educational TV series for kids)
|rowspan=1|The Parents Choice Award, The Dove Foundation Award, The Kids First! Award, The Media Access Award
|rowspan=1|Arranger, producer, composer
|

|-
|rowspan=1|2003
|rowspan=1|"Yo No Soy Esa Mujer" - Paulina Rubio
|rowspan=1|BMI Latin Award 
|rowspan=1|Composer
|

|-
|rowspan=1|2006
|rowspan=1|"Becoming" - Sarah Geronimo
|rowspan=1|ASAP (Philippines) Pop Viewer's Choice Awards: Pop Album of the Year
|rowspan=1|Arranger, composer
|

|-
|rowspan=1|2006
|rowspan=1|"I Still Believe In Loving You" - Sarah Geronimo
|rowspan=1|ASAP (Philippines) Pop Viewer's Choice Awards: Pop Song of the Year 
|rowspan=1|Arranger, composer
|

|-
|rowspan=1|2007
|rowspan=1|"Dream On" - Mark Bautista
|rowspan=1|VIVA Entertainment (Philippines) Gold Album
|rowspan=1|Arranger, composer
|

|-
|rowspan=1|2007
|rowspan=1|"Becoming" - Sarah Geronimo
|rowspan=1|VIVA Entertainment(Philippines) Platinum Album 
|rowspan=1|Arranger, composer
|

|-
|rowspan=1|2009
|rowspan=1|"Music And Me" - Sarah Geronimo
|rowspan=1|VIVA Entertainment(Philippines) Platinum Album 
|rowspan=1|Arranger
|

|-
|rowspan=1|2009
|rowspan=1|"I'll Be The One" - Mark Bautista
|rowspan=1|VIVA Entertainment(Philippines) Platinum Album 
|rowspan=1|Arranger, composer
|

|-
|rowspan=1|2009
|rowspan=1|"Your Christmas Girl" - Sarah Geronimo
|rowspan=1|VIVA Entertainment(Philippines) Platinum Album 
|rowspan=1|Arranger
|

|-
|rowspan=1|2014
|rowspan=1|"Enamorados" - Luz Rios
|rowspan=1|20th Annual USA Songwriting Competition
|rowspan=1|Arranger, producer, composer
|

References

External links 
 Page in MySpace
 Nominations to Latin Grammy
 Winner composers

German record producers
German composers
Latin music musicians
1958 births
2017 deaths